All Saints Cathedral or variations may refer to:

Argentina
All Saints Cathedral, Santa Fe

Canada
All Saints' Anglican Cathedral, Edmonton, Alberta
All Saints Cathedral, Halifax, Nova Scotia

China
All Saints' Cathedral, Hong Kong

Egypt
All Saints' Cathedral, Cairo

India
All Saints Cathedral, Nagpur
All Saints Cathedral, Prayagraj

Kenya
All Saints' Cathedral, Nairobi

Nigeria
All Saints' Cathedral, Onitsha

Uganda
All Saints' Cathedral, Kampala

United Kingdom
Cathedral Church of All Saints, Derby

United States
All Saints Anglican Cathedral, Long Beach, California (cathedral of the ACNA Diocese of Western Anglicans)
Covenant Presbyterian Church, formerly All Saints Cathedral, Chicago, Illinois (former cathedral of the Western Diocese of the Polish National Catholic Church)
All Saints Church, Amesbury, Massachusetts (cathedral of the ACNA Anglican Diocese in New England)
Cathedral of All Saints, Albany, New York (cathedral of the Episcopal Diocese of Albany)
Cathedral Church of All Saints, Milwaukee, Wisconsin (cathedral of the Episcopal Diocese of Milwaukee)
Cathedral Church of All Saints, St. Thomas, U.S. Virgin Islands (cathedral of the Episcopal Diocese of the Virgin Islands)

See also
 All Saints Church (disambiguation)